A*mazing was an Australian children's television game show that aired between 16 May 1994 until 1998 on the Seven Network. It was famous for a relatively large and elaborate maze/obstacle course that was part of the show's studio set. A*mazing was hosted by James Sherry for the entire run of the series. A*mazing was produced at Channel 7 in Brisbane from 1994–1996 and then at Channel 7 in Perth from 1997–1998.

Format
The show pitted teams from two different primary schools against each other during the course of a week. Points gained by each contestant during the week would be totalled up to decide the winning school at the end of each week. There were two rounds of a game called "Timezone", each followed by a maze run, then the contestants competed in a "computer challenge" on a video game.

Timezone
In Timezone, a 90-second countdown timer begins, and Sherry begins to provide clues to a word or phrase to the first school's contestants. Contestants have to correctly guess the word or phrase before running down to a large QWERTY keyboard mounted on the floor and stepping on the letters to spell it out. The process is repeated for the second school. If contestants were unable to guess the word initially, the clues would get easier until the word was spelled out by Sherry. The time remaining determines how many points they get, plus how long each school gets to spend in the maze during round two.

Maze Run
After both teams had completed Timezone, one contestant from each school would enter the maze and attempt to collect the letters of the answer which are hidden in such places as a garbage can, or behind a mock cactus. Ten points are given for every letter they retrieve inside the maze before their time runs out.

Occasionally, the maze would include letters that are not part of the answer; if a contestant collected these superfluous letters, they would not receive any extra points in addition to the points earned by collecting the valid letters.

Computer Challenge
After the teams had completed 2 maze runs, the contestants competed in a video game face off. During the course of the show, three different gaming platforms, all provided by sponsor Nintendo, were used. Originally the Super Nintendo Entertainment System (1994–1996) and later the Nintendo 64 (1997–1998).

Games played included Tetris, Bubsy, Donkey Kong Country, Donkey Kong Country 2: Diddy's Kong Quest, Super Mario World, Nigel Mansell's World Championship, Plok, Pac-Attack, 1080° Snowboarding, Donkey Kong Country 3: Dixie Kong's Double Trouble!, Wave Race 64, Super Mario Kart, Mario Kart 64, San Francisco Rush, Multi-Racing Championship, Cruis'n USA, Diddy Kong Racing, Super Mario 64, Unirally, Winter Gold, Super Mario Bros. 3, Super Tennis, Cruis'n World, and the fly-swatting minigame from Mario Paint.

The team with the most points/fastest time win 50 points for their team, while runners-up in this challenge win 25 points for their team. Should there be a tie (e.g. both teams score the same number of coins in Super Mario Kart or hit the same number of flies in the fly-swatting mini-game from Mario Paint), both teams score 25 points each. Originally, 100 points were awarded to the winners and 50 points to the runners-up.

Bonus Round
After the third round, the team with the highest score would then go back to the maze for 90 seconds (later changed to 120 seconds) to collect keys. One player will choose which side of the maze they want to explore. Only when that player exits that maze can the other player enter the other half of the maze. There were seven keys, including a bonus one, in the maze; each key was worth 100 points. If either of the contestants found the bonus key, then both of the contestants would each get an original Game Boy (also provided by Nintendo), which later became a Game Boy Pocket. Only once were all seven keys found in the maze (under the 90-second rule limit).

If there was a tie after the third round, a sudden-death question was read out to both teams in the style of the first round, and whoever answered the question correctly would technically win the game for the day and go into the maze to search for the keys.

By the end of the week, the school with the highest number of points would win a grand prize, which was usually educational computer software or an encyclopedia set. Other prizes included tickets to the Wet'n'Wild theme park in Gold Coast, Australia.

The Maze

The tables below show the layout of the maze per season, from the start to the end of each side of the maze.

The only parts of the maze that remained for every series were (left to right, start to finish): the mirrored doors, the pipe, the pirate's cove, the desert, the bamboo walk, the yellow slide and the padded stairs.
There was only one occasion during the entire run of the show when host James Sherry was shown to venture into the maze during the game portion of the show. During series two, one player from the winning team grabbed one key and got the key entangled in the fish net at the start of the left-hand side of the maze. After 30 seconds of trying to untangle it, James told them that the key was theirs. After the run, James ventured into the maze to count the keys they collected from the fish net.
At one time during a maze run, at the end of the jungle walk, a contestant went over a fence and into the right-hand side of the maze.
One of the most common locations to find the bonus key was in the car; unfortunately, most of the time, the key in the car was not found.
The shortest ever maze run was 5 seconds, after one team took 85 seconds to correctly answer and type "Todd Woodbridge" (most letters to type at 14). The team managed to grab an "S", but because "S" is not in "Todd Woodbridge", the team managed to only score 5 points (the lowest ever in a round).
Towards the end of the show's run, parts of the set from another show on the Seven Network, Time Masters, appeared on the set of A*mazing as part of the maze. A modified version of the Zig-Zag Run (called "The Wobbly Planks" on Time Masters) from the 'BrainStrain' game appeared on the castle, and the Revolving Pipe (called "The Groove Tube" on Time Masters) replaced the green pipe at the entrance to the pirates' cove. It was also taken from the 'BrainStrain' game, which had been phased out of Time Masters after the first season, in favour of 'Slam Dunk'—which was played with a basketball instead.
The jungle obstacle in the final season featured the Three Wise Monkeys, who were designed after Donkey Kong.
Peter Taylor became the first ever contestant to win the major prize (the Game Boy) on A*mazing.
Controversially, if contestants chose the left route in the maze, they had to step into a smoke-filled pit. At the base of this pit were thousands of ping pong balls. These balls sometimes made the contestants fall back onto their spine on a hard edge. The balls were removed after the first two episodes.

Trivia

 The show was rerun from 1999–2003 on Disney Channel.
 On 9 August 2012, host James Sherry uploaded a video and started a Facebook page urging someone to bring back A*mazing. He has since uploaded 30 videos, but so far there are no official plans to bring the show back at this stage.

References

External links
 

Australian children's game shows
Australian children's television series
Seven Network original programming
1994 Australian television series debuts
1998 Australian television series endings
1990s Australian game shows
Television series by Endemol Australia
Television shows set in Brisbane
Television shows set in Perth, Western Australia
English-language television shows
Television shows about video games
Esports television series